Edelbach may refer to:

 Edelbach (Kahl), a river of Bavaria, Germany, tributary of the Kahl
 Edelbach (Nidda), a river of Hesse, Germany, tributary of the Nidda
 Edelbach, Allentsteig, a cadastral community of Allentsteig in Lower Austria, Austria
 Edelbach, a subdivision of Kleinkahl, a community in Bavaria, Germany